Lara Salden (born 29 January 1999) is a Belgian former tennis player.

She has a career-high singles ranking by the Women's Tennis Association (WTA) of 246, reached on 16 November 2020. She also has a career-high WTA doubles ranking of 202, achieved 15 November 2021. 

Salden won her first major ITF Circuit title at the 2021 Wiesbaden Open, in the doubles draw, partnering Anna Bondár.

Salden retired from professional tennis in August 2022.

ITF Circuit finals

Singles: 10 (6 titles, 4 runner-ups)

Doubles: 18 (12 titles, 6 runner-ups)

References

External links
 
 

1999 births
Living people
Belgian female tennis players
21st-century Belgian women